A-836,339 is a drug developed by Abbott Laboratories that acts as a potent cannabinoid receptor full agonist. It is selective for CB2, with Ki values of 0.64 nM at CB2 vs 270 nM at the psychoactive CB1 receptor, but while it exhibits selective analgesic, anti-inflammatory and anti-hyperalgesic effects at low doses, its high efficacy at both targets results in typical cannabis-like effects appearing at higher doses, despite its low binding affinity for CB1. In 2012 A-836,339 was detected via X-ray crystallography in a "dubious product" sold in Japan, though the product was described as a white powder, not herbal incense, it was suggested to be for human consumption.

References 

Cannabinoids
Thiazoles
Carboxamides
Ethers
Cyclopropanes